Neill-Mauran House is a historic double house located in the Rittenhouse Square West neighborhood of Philadelphia, Pennsylvania, USA. It was designed by the architect Wilson Eyre (1858-1944) and built in 1890. It is a four-story, asymmetrical brick faced dwelling with basement and attic. The entries have brownstone trim and the overall design is in a Medieval Revival style. It has a slate covered gambrel roof, with terra cotta ridge caps and cross gable.

The houses were added to the National Register of Historic Places in 1980.

References

Houses on the National Register of Historic Places in Philadelphia
Houses completed in 1890
Houses in Philadelphia
Rittenhouse Square, Philadelphia